Papademos is a Greek surname and may refer to one of the following people:

 Basil Papademos (born 1957), Canadian writer
 Lucas Papademos (born 1947), Greek economist 

Greek-language surnames
Surnames